Benjamin James Craig (born 9 April 1993) is a field hockey player from Australia, who plays as a midfielder.

Personal life
Benjamin Craig was born and raised in Lane Cove, New South Wales. His younger brother, Tom, is also an international field hockey player for Australia. 

He studied a double degree of Law and International Relations at the University of Sydney.  He followed this up with a masters in International Law at Leiden University in the Netherlands.

Career

National leagues
Craig has represented both the Australian Capital Territory and New South Wales in domestic competitions.

AHL
From 2015 until the leagues dissolution in 2018, Craig was a member of the NSW Waratahs in the Australian Hockey League.  During his AHL career, Craig won one silver and two bronze medals.

Hockey One
In 2022, Craig was named in the Canberra Chill squad for season two of the Sultana Bran Hockey One.

Kookaburras
Craig made his international debut for the Kookaburras in 2016 at the Trans–Tasman Trophy in Auckland.

He was added to the national squad for the first time in 2017. He last appeared for the national team later that year at the Oceania Cup in Sydney, where he won a gold medal.

International goals

References

External links
 
 

1993 births
Living people
Australian male field hockey players
Male field hockey midfielders